Mitchell Andrew Sutton (May 10, 1951 – August 4, 1985) was an American football defensive end. He played for the Philadelphia Eagles from 1974 to 1975.

References

1951 births
1985 deaths
People from Stone Mountain, Georgia
Players of American football from Georgia (U.S. state)
Sportspeople from DeKalb County, Georgia
American football defensive ends
Kansas Jayhawks football players
Philadelphia Eagles players